Medan Chiefs is one of the leading football clubs in Indonesia. Based in Medan, North Sumatra, Medan Chiefs chose Deli Serdang as its home ground. The team plays in the Liga Primer Indonesia. The club is under the management of Mr.Sihar Sitorus, a football enthusiast and businessman. He also manages the other football club from Medan, Pro Titan FC which plays in the Liga Indonesia Premier Division.

Current squad

Coaching staff

References

External links
 official Medan Chiefs website
Medan Chiefs at ligaprimerindonesia.co.id

Defunct football clubs in Indonesia
Football clubs in Indonesia
Association football clubs established in 2010
2010 establishments in Indonesia